Omphalobasella is a monotypic snout moth genus described by Embrik Strand in 1915. Its only species, Omphalobasella inconspicua, described by the same author in the same year, is found in Cameroon.

References

Endemic fauna of Cameroon
Moths described in 1915
Pyralinae
Insects of Cameroon
Moths of Africa
Monotypic moth genera
Pyralidae genera